Squirrel Boys is an Australian web series directed by Kurt Martin and produced by Jim Robison starring Samara Weaving, Paul Barton, Simon Westaway, Ian Bezzina and Jim Robison.

References

Australian comedy web series
2015 television series debuts